Ehikhamenor is a surname. Notable people with the surname include:

Ehinomen Ehikhamenor (born 1980), Nigerian boxer
Victor Ehikhamenor, Nigerian visual artist, writer, and photographer

Surnames of Nigerian origin